Christophe Flacher (born June 5, 1966, in Bourgoin-Jallieu) is a French bobsledder who competed in the early 1990s. He competed in two Winter Olympics. His best finish was eighth in the four-man event at Albertville in 1992.

References
 1992 bobsleigh two-man results
 1992 bobsleigh four-man results
 1994 bobsleigh four-man results

1966 births
Bobsledders at the 1992 Winter Olympics
Bobsledders at the 1994 Winter Olympics
French male bobsledders
Olympic bobsledders of France
Living people
People from Bourgoin-Jallieu
Sportspeople from Isère